Brandon Rogers (born February 27, 1982) is an American former professional ice hockey defenseman who last played with the Iserlohn Roosters in the DEL.

Playing career
Rogers was drafted 118th overall in the 2001 NHL Entry Draft by the Mighty Ducks of Anaheim. He played high school hockey at the Hotchkiss School in Connecticut before undertaking a collegiate career at the University of Michigan for the Michigan Wolverines of the Central Collegiate Hockey Association.

After turning professional, and unsigned, he was invited to the Calgary Flames training camp for the 2005–06 season. Rogers was then assigned to the Flames affiliate the Omaha Ak-Sar-Ben Knights in the AHL before he was loaned to the Norfolk Admirals.

On August 23, 2007, Rogers continued in the AHL after was signed by the Houston Aeros. After a solid 2007–08 season, Rogers he was signed to his first NHL contract, a two-year deal, by parent club the Minnesota Wild on July 15, 2008.

After participating in the Wild's training camp, Rogers was returned to the Aeros for the 2008–09 campaign. As an Alternate Captain, Brandon led the Aeros defense with 29 assists and scored a career-high 32 points in 74 games. Rogers coinciding community efforts throughout the year, saw him earn the Yanick Dupre Memorial Award as the  
AHL's Man of the Year. In the 2009–10 season, Brandon played his third consecutive year with Houston, however due to injury and a lack of form recorded, a career low 8 points in 60 games.

Without an offer of a new contract with the Wild, Rogers remained with the Houston Aeros on a try-out to begin the 2010–11 season. After only one game with the Aeros, he was released on October 27, 2010. As a free agent, Rogers was later signed on a professional try-out agreement with fellow AHL club, the Lake Erie Monsters, on November 6, 2010. After 7 games with the Monsters, Rogers suffered a concussion and was sidelined indefinitely, releasing him from his try-out. On February 1, 2011, he was then signed by Slovakian team, HK SKP Poprad, for the remainder of the season.

In the following season, Rogers enjoyed a full season in the Italian Serie A, playing with HC Bolzano. Upon completion of the campaign, Rogers signed to remain in Europe, stepping up to the German DEL to a one-year contract with the Iserlohn Roosters on June 28, 2012.

In the 2012–13 season, Rogers played in 51 games, registering 20 points from the blueline to finish second amongst Roosters defenseman. Despite being unable to help Iserlohn qualify for the playoffs, Rogers was re-signed to a one-year contract extension on February 13, 2013. On May 16, 2013, despite contracted to the Roosters for the following season, Rogers opted to retire from professional hockey.

Career statistics

Awards and honors

References

External links

1982 births
Living people
American men's ice hockey defensemen
Bolzano HC players
HK Poprad players
Houston Aeros (1994–2013) players
Iserlohn Roosters players
Lake Erie Monsters players
Michigan Wolverines men's ice hockey players
Anaheim Ducks draft picks
Norfolk Admirals players
Omaha Ak-Sar-Ben Knights players
People from Rochester, New Hampshire
Ice hockey people from New Hampshire
Sportspeople from Strafford County, New Hampshire
American expatriate ice hockey players in Germany
American expatriate ice hockey players in Slovakia
American expatriate ice hockey players in Italy
Citizens of Germany through descent
American people of German descent